Melvin Elliott Deutsch (July 26, 1915 – November 18, 2001) was an American professional baseball player. He was a relief pitcher in the Major Leagues who played briefly for the Boston Red Sox during the 1946 season. He was born in Caldwell, Texas.

Deutsch was signed by the Boston Red Sox as a free agent out of the University of Texas at Austin. His professional career lasted from 1941 to 1949 (1945 and 1948 seasons excluded). He served in the United States Army during World War II, missing the 1945 season.

He made three appearances out of the Red Sox bullpen during the early weeks of Boston's 1946 pennant-winning season, posting a 5.68 ERA with two strikeouts and three walks in  innings of work. He allowed seven hits and did not have a decision or a save.

Mel was of German, Czech, and Irish descent. His father, born in Berlin; his mother in Moravia. Languages spoken at home included German and Bohemian. Deutsch died in Austin, Texas at age 86.

See also
Boston Red Sox all-time roster

References

External links

Retrosheet
Nowlin, Bill, Mel Deutsch at the SABR Biography Project

1915 births
2001 deaths
Baseball players from Texas
Boston Red Sox players
Greensboro Red Sox players
Louisville Colonels (minor league) players
Major League Baseball pitchers
Texas Longhorns baseball players
Toronto Maple Leafs (International League) players
Tulsa Oilers (baseball) players
People from Caldwell, Texas
United States Army personnel of World War II
American people of German descent
American people of Czech descent
American people of Moravian-German descent
American people of Irish descent